Alexandra Backford (1942–2010) was an Aleut-American painter from Alaska. She studied at the Institute of American Indian Arts in Santa Fe, New Mexico, in the 1960s and has exhibited her work across the country. Some of her works are in the permanent collection of institutions including the Smithsonian National Museum of the American Indian.

Backford was the daughter of Constantine and Anna Backford of Nushakag, Clark's Point, Alaska. She said of her time at the institute, "I like it here." Some of her work features local landscapes and people at work.

References

External links 
 Alexandra Backford works at the National Museum of the American Indian

1942 births
2010 deaths
20th-century American painters
20th-century indigenous painters of the Americas
20th-century Native Americans
20th-century American women artists
Native American painters
Native American women artists
Painters from Alaska
Aleut people
20th-century Native American women
21st-century American women